Berthold von Stauffenberg may refer to:

 Berthold Schenk Graf von Stauffenberg (1905-1944), German lawyer, conspirator in the 20 July Plot and brother to Claus Schenk Graf von Stauffenberg
 Berthold Maria Schenk Graf von Stauffenberg (born 1934), retired German military officer and oldest son of Claus Schenk Graf von Stauffenberg.